Gerardo Moncada Guiza (born July 25, 1962 in Chipatá) is a Colombian former road cyclist, who was a professional from 1986 to 1994.

Major results

1981
 1st Overall Vuelta de la Juventud de Colombia
1989
 9th Overall Setmana Catalana de Ciclisme
1993
 6th Overall Vuelta a Colombia
1st Stage 2

Grand Tour general classification results timeline

References
 

1962 births
Living people
Colombian male cyclists
Vuelta a Colombia stage winners
Sportspeople from Santander Department
20th-century Colombian people